Daniel Carpo (born 26 November 1984 in Tulcea) is a Romanian rugby union footballer. He plays as number eight.

Club career
Carpo played for RCJ Farul Constanța, from 2002/03 to 2010/11. Currently he is playing for Dinamo București, in the Romanian Rugby Championship. He was MVP for two years in a row, in 2010 and 2011.

International career
Carpo has 54 caps for Romania, since 2007, with 9 tries scored, 45 points on aggregate. He had his first game at the 19-8 win over Italy A, at 10 June 2007, in Bucharest, for the IRB Nations Cup. He was called for the 2011 Rugby World Cup, playing in three games and scoring a try in the 34-24 loss to Scotland, and for the 2015 Rugby World Cup, where he played once again in three games but without scoring.

References

External links

 
 
 
 

1984 births
Living people
Romanian rugby union players
Rugby union number eights
Romania international rugby union players
RCJ Farul Constanța players
SCM Rugby Timișoara players
CSM București (rugby union) players
Richmond F.C. players
CS Dinamo București (rugby union) players
Romanian expatriate sportspeople in England
Expatriate rugby union players in England
People from Tulcea